Thomas Andrew Blane (1881 – 19 August 1940) was a British businessman and Coalition Conservative MP for Leicester South.

He won the seat in 1918, but stood down in 1922.

He also stood for the London County Council in Bethnal Green North East, for the Municipal Reform Party. He died in Adelaide, Australia.

Sources
F W S Craig, British Parliamentary Election Results, 1918–1949; Political Reference Publications, Glasgow, 1949
London Municipal Notes, 1913
Whitaker's Almanack, 1919 to 1922 editions

Conservative Party (UK) MPs for English constituencies
Members of the Parliament of the United Kingdom for Leicestershire
1881 births
1940 deaths
20th-century British businesspeople
Municipal Reform Party politicians